Mons Røisland (born 28 January 1997) is a Norwegian snowboarder who won a bronze medal in slopestyle at Winter X Games XX.

He finished 20th in the big air event at the 2017 World Championships, 12th in the slopestyle event at the 2018 Winter Olympics, and 7th in the slopestyle event at the 2019 World Championships. He competed in 2022 Winter Olympics and won the silver in the Big Air event.

Career 
Røisland began snowboarding at eight years old on a trip around the world involving a three-month stop in Whistler, British Columbia, Canada and was immediately hooked. 

One of his sponsors, Rockstar Energy Drink, lists the following career honors, awards, and highlights on their website:

 2016 X Games Aspen 3rd Place Slopestyle 
 2015 WSF World Rookie Champion 
 Pamparovo Freestyle Open Slopestyle 2nd Place 
 2015 Red Bull Nanshan Open 1st Place 
 2014 Burton European Open 3rd Place

More recent activity as per Superheroes Management includes:

 2020 X Games Snowboard Slopestyle, Aspen, CO, 2nd Place
 2019 X Games, Aspen, CO, 3rd Place
 2019 World Cup, Kreischberg, AUT, 1st Place
 2018 Dew Tour, Breckenridge, CO, 3rd Place Slopestyle
 2018 Dew Tour, Breckenridge, CO, 1st Place Team Challenge: DC
 2018 Winter Games NZ, Cardrona, NZ, 3rd Place
 2018 Olympics, Pyeongchang, Finalist Snowboard Slopestyle
 2018 Norwegian National Team Member, Pyeongchang
 2017 Dew Tour, Breckenridge, CO, 3rd Place
 2017 Big Air World Cup, Copper Mountain, CO, 1st Place
 2017 MarMor, Stubai
 2017 MarMor, Saas Fee
 2017 Up in the Valley 5, Perisher Parks
 2017 DC Hit & Run, Meribel, France, 1st Place
 2017 DC Hit & Run, Meribel, France, Best Trick

He has cited his favorite Team Norway rider as being Aleksander Østreng, stating that Østreng "is the sickest rider to watch in contests, cruising park, powder or street."

When asked what his plans are after he finishes riding his snowboard for good, Røisland said he plans "to ride some more."

References

External links
 
 
 
 
 

1997 births
Living people
Sportspeople from Bærum
X Games athletes
Norwegian male snowboarders
Olympic snowboarders of Norway
Snowboarders at the 2018 Winter Olympics
Snowboarders at the 2022 Winter Olympics
Medalists at the 2022 Winter Olympics
Olympic silver medalists for Norway
Olympic medalists in snowboarding
21st-century Norwegian people